Bubnovo is a rural locality (a selo) and the administrative center of Bubnovskoye Rural Settlement, Korochansky District, Belgorod Oblast, Russia. The population was 451 as of 2010. There are 7 streets.

Geography 
Bubnovo is located 27 km east of Korocha (the district's administrative centre) by road. Loznoye is the nearest rural locality.

References 

Rural localities in Korochansky District